Szczecinek railway station is a railway station serving the town of Szczecinek, in the West Pomeranian Voivodeship, Poland. The station is located on the Piła–Ustka railway, Szczecinek–Kołobrzeg railway and Chojnice–Runowo Pomorskie railway. The train services are operated by PKP and Przewozy Regionalne.

Train services
The station is served by the following service(s):

 Intercity services (IC) Kołobrzeg - Piła - Bydgoszcz - Warszawa - Lublin - Hrubieszów 
Intercity services (IC) Ustka - Koszalin - Poznań - Wrocław - Opole - Bielsko-Biała
Intercity services (IC) Ustka - Koszalin - Poznań - Wrocław - Katowice - Kraków - Rzeszów - Przemyśl
Intercity services (IC) Słupsk - Koszalin - Poznań - Wrocław
Intercity services (IC) Słupsk - Koszalin - Poznań - Wrocław - Opole - Katowice
Regional services (R) Kolobrzeg - Bialogard - Szczecinek - Pila - Oborniki - Poznan
Regional services (R) Koszalin - Bialogard - Szczecinek - Pila - Oborniki - Poznan
Regional services (R) Słupsk — Miastko
Regional services (R) Słupsk — Miastko — Szczecinek
Regional services (R) Słupsk — Miastko — Szczecinek — Chojnice
Regional services (R) Szczecinek — Chojnice
Regional services (R) Miastko — Szczecinek — Runowo Pomorskie
Regional services (R) Szczecinek - Drawsko Pomorskie - Stargard - Szczecin

References 

 This article is based upon a translation of the Polish language version as of July 2016.

External links 

Railway stations in West Pomeranian Voivodeship
Człuchów County